William Coventry (–1686) was an English statesman.

William Coventry may also refer to:

 William of Coventry, an English Carmelite friar and historian

William Coventry, 5th Earl of Coventry (–1751), an English nobleman and politician

See also
William Coventre (disambiguation)